Mahon is a surname. Notable people with the surname include:

Alan Mahon (b. 1951), Judge of the (Irish) Court of Appeal, formerly Chair of the Mahon Tribunal
Alan Mahon (b. 1978), Irish footballer
Alex Mahon (b. 1973), British broadcaster, CEO of Channel 4
Alice Mahon (b. 1937), English trade unionist and Labour Party politician
Brendan Mahon (b. 1995), American football player
 Major Denis Mahon (British Army officer), assassinated in 1847 on or near his estate in County Roscommon, Ireland
Sir Denis Mahon (1910–2011), British collector and historian of Italian art
Derek Mahon (1941–2020), Northern Irish poet
Gavin Mahon (b. 1977), professional English football player
George H. Mahon (1900–1985), American politician
Hugh Mahon (1857–1931), Irish-born Australian politician
James Patrick Mahon (1800–1891), Irish nationalist journalist, barrister, parliamentarian and international mercenary
Mark Mahon (director) (born 1973), Irish film director
Mark Mahon (ice hockey coach) (born 1965) Canadian ice hockey coach
Mark Mahon (politician) (born 1957), American politician and judge
Mark P. Mahon (1930-2017), American politician
Patrick Mahon, convicted of the 1924 Crumbles murders
Pete Mahon (b. 1947), Irish football manager
Peter Mahon (lawyer)  (1923–1986), New Zealand barrister
Peter Mahon (UK politician) (1909–1980), British Labour Party Member of Parliament
Simon Mahon (1914–1986), British Labour Party politician
Thomas J. Mahon (1882–1927) American politician and jurist

Surnames of Irish origin